Roderick "Rocky" Trice (born June 14, 1984) is an American retired basketball player.

Professional career
In June 2006, Trice signed with ratiopharm Ulm for the 2009–10 season. Trice spent the 2014-15 season with Śląsk Wrocław and averaged 13 points and 2.3 assists per game. He signed with Riesen Ludwigsburg on August 3, 2015.

References

External links
South Carolina Gamecocks bio

1984 births
Living people
American expatriate basketball people in Germany
American expatriate basketball people in Poland
American men's basketball players
Basketball players from Atlanta
BG Göttingen players
Cuxhaven BasCats players
Czarni Słupsk players
Perimeter College at Georgia State University alumni
Junior college men's basketball players in the United States
Riesen Ludwigsburg players
MKS Dąbrowa Górnicza (basketball) players
ratiopharm Ulm players
Shooting guards
Śląsk Wrocław basketball players
South Carolina Gamecocks men's basketball players